Eduardo de Souza Ney Barroca (born 22 April 1982) is a Brazilian professional football coach.

Career
Born in Rio de Janeiro, Barroca started his career aat Flamengo in 2000, working as a fitness coach of the under-13 squad. In 2003 he moved to Madureira, being appointed assistant coach.

Barroca's first coaching experience occurred with Sendas in 2007, as he was in charge of the under-17s; the following year, he was named first team coach. In 2009, he joined Pão de Açúcar EC as an assistant.

In January 2011, after a short stint as Corinthians' under-17 head coach, Barroca joined Bahia, working as Rogério Lourenço's assistant. On 9 February 2011, he was the club's interim coach during a 2–0 Campeonato Baiano defeat of Camaçari, as Lourenço was sacked.

Barroca acted as an interim for Bahia in a further eight occasions, being also the youngest head coach to win a Série A match after defeating Flamengo on 4 September 2011, aged only 29. On 18 May 2013, he left the club, and subsequently returned to Sendas (now named Audax Rio) to work as an assistant coach of the under-20s. The following January, he joined Botafogo as a permanent assistant coach of the first team.

On 2 June 2014, Barroca signed for Fluminense to work as a coordinator. The following 5 January, he was named Doriva's assistant at Vasco da Gama.

On 1 March 2016, Barroca returned to Botafogo, being named head coach of the under-20 squad. On 29 May 2018, he moved back to Corinthians, also as an under-20 coach.

On 14 April 2019, Barroca was announced as head coach of Botafogo, replacing fired Zé Ricardo. On 6 October, however, he was himself sacked after a poor run of results, and took over Atlético Goianiense eight days later.

In December 2019, after taking Atlético to the top tier, Barroca left the club, and was appointed head coach of another newly promoted side, Coritiba, on 20 December. He was sacked the following 20 August, as the club was ranked last in the league.

Barroca took over Vitória in the second division on 7 October 2020. He left the club on 27 November to return to his former side Botafogo, in the place of Ramón Díaz, but was himself dismissed the following 6 February, after the club's relegation.

On 27 May 2021, Barroca returned to Atlético Goianiense, in the place of Jorginho. He left on a mutual agreement on 27 September, after only one win in the last ten matches.

On 13 February 2022, Barroca was named head coach of Avaí, also in the top tier. On 12 September, with the club in the relegation zone, he was sacked, and returned to Bahia in the second division on 2 October.

On 6 November 2022, after achieving promotion to the top tier, Barroca left Bahia.

Coaching statistics

References

External links

1982 births
Living people
Sportspeople from Rio de Janeiro (city)
Brazilian football managers
Campeonato Brasileiro Série A managers
Campeonato Brasileiro Série B managers
Esporte Clube Bahia managers
Botafogo de Futebol e Regatas managers
Atlético Clube Goianiense managers
Coritiba Foot Ball Club managers
Esporte Clube Vitória managers
Avaí FC managers